White Californians are white Americans living in California who currently make up 71.9% of the state's population.

As of 2015, California has the third-largest minority population in the United States.  Non-Hispanic whites decreased from about 76.3–78% of the state's population in 1970 to 36.5% in 2019. It was estimated in 2015 that Hispanic and Latino Americans became more numerous than non-Hispanic White Americans for the first time. Since 2000 (the US Census), California has been known as the second state in US history (after Hawaii since its statehood in 1959) to have a non-white majority. The most common European ancestries in California are German, Irish, English, Italian, French, Scottish, Polish, Russian, Swedish, Norwegian, Dutch, and Portuguese. Arabs, Afghans, Armenians, and Persians are counted as white in California. Most people who identify as white in California say their heritage is Mexican, German, Irish, English, Italian, French, Spanish, Scottish, Polish, Salvadoran, Swedish, Portuguese, Dutch, or Armenian. There is also a sizable Iranian, Bulgarian, Romanian, Greek, Hungarian, Austrian, Danish, Lithuanian, Finnish, Lebanese, Ukrainian, white Australian, Croatian, Serbian, Slovak and Albanian population in California. California is also home to a large Jewish community.

History

The first White people to come to the modern-day State of California were the Spanish people. The area that became California was a part of the Spanish Empire, and after 1821, part of Mexico.  While under Spanish and Mexican rule, California's population was a diverse mix of people with White, Mestizo, African and Indigenous ancestry, with Native people being the largest population.  By 1846, more White Americans had begun to enter California from other parts of the United States,  making up 10% of the non-Native population.

The California Gold Rush (1848–1855) began on January 24, 1848, when gold was found by James W. Marshall at Sutter's Mill in Coloma, California. In 1848, there were 7,000 persons of Mexican and Spanish descent, 700 Americans, 200 Europeans, and 110,000 Native Americans. The news of gold brought some 300,000 people throughout the Gold Rush to California from the rest of the United States and abroad. Two-thirds of these new arrivals were Americans, mostly from the Atlantic Seaboard.  
In 1850, a year after California's admission to the United States,  the first state census showed California's entire non-Native population at 92,597.

While Northern California became predominantly white by the mid-19th century, Southern California remained mainly Mexican until the first major waves of white immigrants began to arrive in the 1880s after the Southern Pacific railroad reach Los Angeles. Between 1880 and 1920, Southern California’s population grew from 64,000 to 1.3 million, which included an influx of white health-seekers, real estate investors, and Midwestern farmers. As Southern California in the late nineteenth century was promoted as a “semi-tropical” paradise ideal for health and agriculture, these groups of immigrants, many of whom were middle-to-upper-class Americans, moved into the region via the newly built railroads connecting Southern California to the rest of the United States. A 1913 census shows that white Americans composed 95% of California’s population. Other sources note that by 1910, 96% of the population of Los Angeles was white.  Although this is probably an overestimation due to flaws in statistical methods, it shows the significant white predominance in California by the early 20th century. 

In the 1930s, about 350,000 mostly White migrants, known as Okies, came to California from the rural Great Plains states and the surrounding area. Their descendants may make up as much as one eighth of California's population, particularly in the Central Valley and rural areas.

As a result of new arrivals from the American Midwest and  continued immigration to the United States from other countries, California's White population grew, and by 1940, 90% of the state self-identified as White.  By 1990, following increased arrivals into the state of people of other races and nationalities, the White non-hispanic population had decreased,  with 43% of the state population claiming Asian, African, Latin American or Native American ancestry.

By region

San Francisco Bay Area
In 2000 the racial makeup of the nine-county Bay Area was 3,941,687 (58.1%) white and 3,392,204 (50.0%) non-Hispanic white.

In 2010 the Bay Area was 3,755,823 (52.5%) White, and 3,032,903 (42.4%) non-Hispanic white.

The percentage of non-Hispanic white people in the overall Bay Area is projected to decrease, while the percentage of non-Hispanic white people in the city of San Francisco is projected to increase.

Los Angeles metropolitan area
54.6% White, 32.2% white alone. Malibu, Hidden Hills, Manhattan Beach, Agua Dulce, Calabasas and Agoura Hills have the highest percentage of whites in Los Angeles County. Whites in the Los Angeles area are also concentrated in Hollywood Hills, Bel Air and North San Gabriel Valley.

By county
Colusa County has the highest white percentage of any county in California.

Politics

Non-Hispanic whites make up 60% of registered voters in California.

47% of Californian whites voted for Donald Trump and 51% of whites voted for Joe Biden in 2020.

50% of whites in California voted for Hillary Clinton in 2016 while 45% voted for Trump in 2016. White men in California showed slightly more preference for Trump. 50% of white men in California voted for Trump and 57% of white women voted for Clinton.

Future
The non-Hispanic white population as a percentage of the whole is projected to decrease in California.

Demographics

Notable people 
Arnold Schwarzenegger
Daryl Gates
Gavin Newsom
Nancy Pelosi
Tom Brady
Sara Jacobs
Dianne Feinstein
Kim Kardashian
Ben Affleck
Steve Jobs
Leonardo DiCaprio
Robert Norton Noyce
Kris Jenner
Robert Stack

See also

 Demographics of California
 Hispanics and Latinos in California
 Ukrainian Americans in Los Angeles
 Basque Americans in California
 Iranians in Los Angeles
 Armenians in Los Angeles
 Palestinians in Los Angeles
 Israelis in Los Angeles

References

Bibliography
 Maharidge, Dale, The Coming White Minority: California's Eruptions and America's Future, 1996, Times Books, 
 Sherburne Friend Cook, The Conflict Between the California Indian and White Civilization, 1943, University of California Press,